Yu Yali (born 25 April 1978) is a Chinese field hockey player. She competed in the women's tournament at the 2000 Summer Olympics.

References

External links
 

1978 births
Living people
Chinese female field hockey players
Olympic field hockey players of China
Field hockey players at the 2000 Summer Olympics
Place of birth missing (living people)